Chione chipolana is an extinct species of bivalve in the family Veneridae.

References

Veneridae
Prehistoric bivalves